{{DISPLAYTITLE:C14H11Cl2NO2}}
The molecular formula C14H11Cl2NO2 (molar mass: 296.15 g/mol, exact mass: 295.0167 u) may refer to:

Diclofenac
Meclofenamic acid

Molecular formulas